Sanguinetto is a comune (municipality) in the Province of Verona in the Italian region Veneto, located about  southwest of Venice and about  southeast of Verona.

The municipality of Sanguinetto contains the frazione (subdivision) Venera.

Sanguinetto borders the following municipalities: Casaleone, Cerea, Concamarise, Gazzo Veronese, Nogara, and Salizzole.

Demographic evolution

References

External links
 www.comune.sanguinetto.vr.it/

Cities and towns in Veneto